VakıfBank Sports Club is a Turkish volleyball club based in Istanbul, Turkey. Founded in 1986, VakıfBank SK are currently one of the best women's volleyball teams in the world, having won the FIVB Volleyball Women's Club World Championship a record four times and the European Champions League five times to date.

From 23 October 2012 to 22 January 2014 the team held a 73-games winning streak in all official domestic and international competitions, which was acknowledged as a world record by Guinness World Records. The club won all 52 official games played during the 2012–13 season and all 51 official games played in 2013. VakıfBank collected all five championship trophies unbeaten in the 2012–13 season, being the only club in volleyball history to have achieved this unparalleled feat.

History
The team was established following a merger between two separate teams: VakıfBank and Güneş Sigorta. VakıfBank were originally an Ankara-based team but moved to Istanbul after the merger. Their name changed to VakıfBank Güneş Sigorta, VakıfBank Güneş Sigorta Türk Telekom (VGSTT), VakıfBank Türk Telekom and VakıfBank respectively.

VakıfBank won three unbeaten CEV Champions League championships in 2011, 2013, 2017 and 2018, and are the only unbeaten champions in European Champions League history. They also placed second in 1998 and 1999 in this competition. They won the 2013,2017 and 2018 Club World Championship, the CEV Top Teams Cup in 2004 and CEV Challenge Cup in 2008 while finishing second in the FIVB Volleyball Women's Club World Championship in 2011 and third in the European Confederation Cup of 2000.

The team is coached by Italian Giovanni Guidetti. VakıfBank won 47 games of 47 in the 2012–13 season in all competitions including the European Champions League (12 games), Turkish League (29 games), and Turkish Cup (6 games). After that season, they kept most of the players and coaching staff for the 2013–14 season with little changes: Jelena Nikolic, who took a break volleyball for one year, came back to the team and Italian international Carolina Costagrande transfers from Chinese club Guangdong Evergrande V.C. instead of Polish spiker Malgorzata Glinka and Japanese Saori Kimura. Glinka left the team after three great seasons and moved to her home country for familial reasons.

From 23 October 2012 to 22 January 2014, VakıfBank won 73 consecutive victories in all official competitions, which was acknowledged as a world record by Guinness World Records. During this feat the team won an unprecedented 5 trophies including the Club World Championship, European Champions League, and the domestic treble consisting of the Turkish National League, Turkish Cup and Turkish Super Cup. Their streak was finally ended on 27 January 2014 in a game against rivals Fenerbahçe.

Venue
Since 2016 the club have played their home matches at the VakıfBank Sports Palace in Istanbul, the venue has a 2,000 spectators capacity.

Current roster
As of October 2022.

Honours

International competitions
  FIVB Volleyball Women's Club World Championship
 Winners (4): 2013, 2017, 2018, 2021
 Runners-up (1): 2011
 Third place (2): 2016, 2019
  CEV Champions League
 Winners (5): 2010–11, 2012–13, 2016–17, 2017–18, 2021–22
 Runners-up (5): 1998, 1999, 2013–14, 2015–16, 2020–21
 Third place (1): 2014–15
  CEV Cup
 Winners (1): 2004
  CEV Challenge Cup
 Winners (1): 2008
  Women's Top Volley International 
 Winners (1): 2008

Domestic competitions
 Turkish Women's Volleyball League
 Winners (13): 1992, 1993, 1997, 1998, 2004, 2005, 2013, 2014, 2016, 2018, 2019, 2021, 2022
 Turkish Cup 
 Winners (8): 1995, 1997, 1998, 2013, 2014, 2018, 2021, 2022
 Turkish Super Cup 
 Winners (4): 2013, 2014, 2017, 2021
 Runners-up (4): 2010, 2015, 2018, 2020

Season by season

Previous names
 1986–1999: Güneş Sigorta
 1999–2009: VakıfBank Güneş Sigorta
 2009–2011: VakıfBank Güneş Sigorta Türk Telekom
 2011–2012: VakıfBank Türk Telekom
 2012–present: VakıfBank

Notable players

Domestic Players

 Neslihan Demir (2002–2006/2008–2010)
 Naz Aydemir Akyol (2012-2018)
 Polen Uslupehlivan (2008–2010/2012–2014)
 Arzu Göllü (2007–2010)
 Özge Kırdar Çemberci (2008–2012)
 Gözde Kırdar Sonsırma (2010–2018)
 Nilay Özdemir (2009–2012)
 Elif Ağca Öner (2001–2007/2008–2009)
 Gizem Güreşen (2009–2015)
 Bahar Toksoy (2007–2015)
 Ergül Avcı (2011–2013)
 Aysun Özbek (1996–2008)
 Güldeniz Önal (2008–2015)
 Ebrar Karakurt (2016–2020)
 Meliha İsmailoğlu (2019–2021)
 Gizem Örge (2013–2021)
 Gözde Yılmaz (2019–2021)
 Tuğba Şenoğlu (2013-15/2017-18/2020-22)

European Players

 Elitsa Vasileva (2014–2015)

 Maja Poljak (2009–2011)

 Kinga Maculewicz (2008–2010)

 Sylvia Roll (2007–2008) 
 Angelina Grün (2008–2009)
 Christiane Fürst (2011–2014)

 Debby Stam (2009–2010)
 Robin de Kruijf (2014–2016)
 Anne Buijs (2015–2016)
 Lonneke Slöetjes (2015–2019)
 Nika Daalderop (2022–)

 Carolina Costagrande (2013-2015)
 Paola Egonu (2022–2023)

 Małgorzata Glinka-Mogentale (2010–2013)

 Yuliya Svistina (2001–2002)
 Nadezhda Shopova (2001–2002)

 Jelena Nikolić (2008–2012/2013–2014)
 Jovana Brakočević (2012–2014)
 Milena Rašić (2014–2021)
 Maja Ognjenović (2019–2021)

 Isabelle Haak (2019–2022)

Non-European Players

 Annerys Vargas (2007–2008)

 Hilma Caldeira (1999–2002)
 Marcia Fu (1999–2000)
 Tatiana Alves Dos Santos (2005–2006)
 Nikolle Del Rio Correa (2006–2007)	
 Sheilla Castro (2014–2016)
 Gabriela Guimarães (2019–)

 Pan Wenli (2001-2002)
 Zhu Ting (2016–2019)

 Saori Kimura (2012–2013)

 Kimberly Hill (2015–2017)
 Kelsey Robinson (2017–2019)
 Michelle Bartsch-Hackley (2019–2021)
 Chiaka Ogbogu (2020–)
 Kara Bajema'' (2022–)

|

Players written in italic still play for the club.

See also
 Turkey women's national volleyball team
 Turkish women in sports
 Perfect season#Volleyball
 VakıfBank

References

External links
 Official website

 
Volleyball clubs established in 1986
1986 establishments in Turkey
Volleyball clubs in Istanbul
Women's volleyball teams in Turkey